Slobodan Medojević (Serbian Cyrillic: Слободан Медојевић; born 20 November 1990) is a Serbian footballer who plays as a defensive midfielder for Cypriot First Division club AEL Limassol.

Club career

Vojvodina
Medojević came through the youth ranks at Vojvodina and made his professional debut during the 2006–07 season, in a 1–0 away win against Mladost Apatin on 2 May 2007. However, because of his young age, he failed to make appearances during the 2007–08 season. In the 2008–09 season, he returned to the first team and made two league appearances. From the 2009–10 season, Medojević became an important member of the team and collected 25 league appearances, scoring two goals.

Wolfsburg
On 2 January 2012, after four years playing for Vojvodina, Medojević signed his first contract outside of Serbia with Bundesliga contender VfL Wolfsburg. He finally made his league debut during a 2–2 home draw against 1. FC Nürnberg on 31 March 2013. He was kept off the field by a chronically inflamed achilles tendon while at Wolfsburg, and had not recovered from his injury when he left.

Eintracht Frankfurt
On 31 August 2014, Medojević signed with Eintracht Frankfurt on a three-year contract. He underwent surgery for his chronic achilles tendon injury, after which a long period of recovery followed. He made his return for Eintracht on 30 September 2017 in a 2–1 win against VfB Stuttgart, after having spent 565 days without playing a professional match.

Darmstadt 98
In January 2019, Medojević signed a one-and-a-half year contract with Darmstadt 98.

Career statistics

Honours
Vojvodina
Serbian SuperLiga runner-up: 2008–09
Serbian Cup runner-up: 2009–10, 2010–11

VfL Wolfsburg
DFB-Pokal: 2014–15

Eintracht Frankfurt
DFB-Pokal: 2017–18; Runner-up 2016–17

AEL Limassol
 Cypriot Super Cup runner-up: 2019

Individual
 Serbian SuperLiga Team of the Season: 2010–11

References

External links 
 Slobodan Medojević at UEFA

1990 births
Living people
Footballers from Novi Sad
Serbian footballers
Association football midfielders
Serbia youth international footballers
Serbia under-21 international footballers
FK Vojvodina players
VfL Wolfsburg players
Eintracht Frankfurt players
SV Darmstadt 98 players
AEL Limassol players
Bundesliga players
2. Bundesliga players
Cypriot First Division players
Serbian SuperLiga players
Serbian expatriate footballers
Expatriate footballers in Germany
Expatriate footballers in Cyprus